Englewood is a corruption of Dutch Engelse woud (English woods or forest) & Engelse buurt, or "English Neighborhood", which originally referred to Englewood, New Jersey's status as one of the few English-speaking settlements in Dutch-speaking New Netherland. Today, the name may refer to:

Places
 Canada
 Englewood, British Columbia

 United States
 Englewood, California
 Englewood, Colorado
Englewood (RTD), transit station in Englewood, Colorado
Federal Correctional Institution, Englewood
 Englewood, Florida
 Englewood (Columbus, Georgia), a neighborhood
 Englewood, Chicago, Illinois
 West Englewood, Chicago, Illinois
 Englewood, Kansas
 Englewood, Missouri
 Englewood, New Jersey
 Englewood Cliffs, New Jersey
 Englewood, Ohio
 Englewood, South Dakota
 Englewood, Tennessee
 Englewood, Wisconsin

Other
 the Englewood Railway in British Columbia

See also
 Inglewood (disambiguation)